Michael Josef Longo (March 19, 1937 – March 22, 2020) was an American jazz pianist, composer, and author.

Early life
Longo was born in Cincinnati, Ohio to parents who had a musical background. His father played bass, his mother played organ at church, and his music training began at a young age. Mike recalled seeing Sugar Chile Robinson playing boogie woogie piano: "The first time I saw him, man, he knocked me out. I must have been three or four years old. He played after the Count Basie show, so I went home and started picking out boogie woogie bass lines." His parents took him for formal lessons at the Cincinnati Conservatory of Music at four. He moved to Fort Lauderdale, Florida soon after. At the age of 12, he won a local talent contest.

Career
Longo's career began in his father's band, but later Cannonball Adderley helped him get gigs of his own. Their working relationship pre-dated Adderley's emergence as a band leader. Adderley approached the teenaged Longo because he needed a pianist at his church. At this time the town was largely segregated, so the white Longo playing at a black church was unusual. When this led to recordings with Adderley in the mid-1950s, Longo was too young to go to clubs with him. Longo played at Porky's, which was later portrayed in the movie. He would go on to receive his Bachelor of Music degree from Western Kentucky University.

Dizzy Gillespie heard Longo at the Metropole. "I was playing downstairs with Red Allen, and Dizzy was playing upstairs with his band. So every time he wanted to go outside for a break, he had to come down the stairs and pass us on the way out. There was a joint across the street called the Copper Rail, which was a soul food restaurant and a bar where the musicians from the Metropole would all hang out. Soon I learned Dizzy mentioned me in an interview in International Musician, the musician union's magazine, when he was asked about any promising young musicians he'd heard." He was a fan of Oscar Peterson from a young age and he studied with the pianist from 1961 to 1962. "In terms of technique, touch, I was playing with locked wrists and too much arm technique. The main thing I got from Peterson was how to play piano and how to be a jazz pianist- textures, voicings, touch, time, conception, tone on the instrument."

In the 1960s, Longo began to lead the Mike Longo Trio, which would remain active for the next 42 years. Gillespie was playing at the Metropole again and Longo, depressed after divorcing his first wife, had just gained a gig at Embers West playing with Roy Eldridge. Eldridge brought Gillespie to see Longo playing with Paul Chambers. Gillespie hired Longo the next day. Longo became musical director for the Dizzy Gillespie Quintet and later Gillespie chose him to be the pianist for the Dizzy Gillespie All-Star Band. From 1966 onward, his music career would be linked to Gillespie. In 1993, Longo was with Gillespie on the night he died and later delivered a eulogy at his funeral.

Longo performed at weekly jazz sessions held at the Baháʼí center in honor of Gillespie, a tradition he helped start. Like Gillespie, he was a member of the Baháʼí Faith. Longo also taught a master class to upcoming jazz musicians including Adam Rafferty. Longo's big band, the New York State of the Art Jazz Ensemble, would play at the center intermittently and provide upcoming musicians a chance to learn on stage and the audience receives a jazz experience at reasonable cost. A big part of Mike Longo's mission was to re-establish the apprenticeship relationship in teaching jazz. He said "I know jazz education is an important thing and I know that the field means well, but there seems to be a trend in that field to teach jazz where people are actually copying off recordings instead of actually learning to play jazz. The apprenticeship aspect of jazz has always been the way it has evolved."

Awards and honors
Mike Longo received a scholarship from the Ft. Lauderdale Symphony Orchestra in 1955, a Downbeat Hall of Fame Scholarship in 1959, and a National Endowment for the Arts Grant in 1972. He was inducted into Western Kentucky University's Wall of Fame in 2002.

Death
Longo died in Manhattan on March 23, 2020, three days after his 83rd birthday, from complications of COVID-19. He was survived by his wife of 32 years, Dorothy Longo.

Discography

As leader/co-leader
{| class="wikitable sortable"
!Year recorded
!Title
!Label
!Personnel/Notes
|-
|1962?
|A Jazz Portrait of Funny Girl
|Clamike
|Trio, with Herman Wright (bass), Roy Brooks (drums)
|-
|1972
|The Awakening
|Mainstream
|
|-
|1972
|Matrix
|Mainstream
|
|-
|1974
|Funkia
|Groove Merchant
|
|-
|1974
|900 Shares of the Blues
|Groove Merchant
|
|-
|1976
|Talk with the Spirits
|Pablo
|Septet, with Virgil Jones (trumpet), Harold Vick (tenor sax), George Davis (guitar), Bob Cranshaw (bass), Mickey Roker (drums), Dizzy Gillespie (congas, vocals)
|-
|1977
|Jazzberry Patch
|JPB
|
|-
|1978
|New York '78
|Consolidated Artists
|With big band; released 1990s
|-
|1981
|Solo Recital
|Consolidated Artists
|
|-
|1990
|The Earth Is But One Country
|Consolidated Artists
|
|-
|1993
|First Impressions
|Consolidated Artists
|
|-
|1997
|I Miss You John
|Consolidated Artists
|
|-
|1998
|Dawn of a New Day
|Consolidated Artists
|
|-
|2000
|Explosion
|Consolidated Artists
|With the New York State of the Art Jazz Ensemble
|-
|2001
|Still Swingin|Consolidated Artists
|Trio, with Ben Brown (bass), Ray Mosca (drums)
|-
|2001
|Aftermath
|Consolidated Artists
|With big band
|-
|2002
|Live: The Detroit International Jazz Festival
|Consolidated Artists
|Trio, with Santi Debriano (bass), Ray Mosca (drums); in concert
|-
|2004
|Oasis
|Consolidated Artists
|With big band
|-
|2007
|Float Like a Butterfly
|Consolidated Artists
|Trio, with Paul West (bass), Jimmy Wormworth (drums)
|-
|2009
|Sting Like a Bee
|Consolidated Artists
|Trio, with Bob Cranshaw (bass), Lewis Nash (drums)
|-
|2011
|To My Surprise
|Consolidated Artists
|Six tracks trio, with Bob Cranshaw (bass), Lewis Nash (drums); six tracks quintet, with Lance Bryant (tenor sax), Jimmy Owens (trumpet) added
|-
|2012
|A Celebration of Diz and Miles
|Consolidated Artists
|Trio, with Paul West (bass), Ray Mosca (drums); in concert
|-
|2013
|Celebrates Oscar Peterson
|Consolidated Artists
|Trio, with Paul West (bass), Ray Mosca (drums); in concert
|-
|2017
|Only Time Will Tell
|Consolidated Artists
|Trio, with Paul West (bass), Lewis Nash (drums)
|}

As sidemanWith Dizzy Gillespie Swing Low, Sweet Cadillac (Impulse!, 1967)
 The Dizzy Gillespie Reunion Big Band (MPS, 1968)
 The Real Thing (Perception, 1969)
 Portrait of Jenny (Perception, 1970)With Lee Konitz'''
 Chicago 'n All That Jazz'' (Groove Merchant, 1975)

References

External links

Interview with Mike Longo
All about Jazz interview
 
  

American jazz pianists
American male pianists
1937 births
2020 deaths
Musicians from Cincinnati
American Bahá'ís
Mainstream Records artists
20th-century Bahá'ís
21st-century Bahá'ís
Western Kentucky University alumni
20th-century American pianists
21st-century American pianists
20th-century American male musicians
21st-century American male musicians
American male jazz musicians
Deaths from the COVID-19 pandemic in New York (state)